

I

References

Lists of words